Men of Plastic is a 2022 South Korean comedy film directed by Lim Jin-sun, starring Ma Dong-seok and Jung Kyung-ho. It was released on November 30, 2022.

Synopsis
Dae-guk is a man who was born and raised in Apgujeong-dong, an affluent neighborhood in Gangnam District in southern Seoul where plastic surgery and skin care clinics abound. He has booming business ideas and is eager to start his own plastic surgery business. He encounters Ji-woo (Jung Kyung-ho), the most talented plastic surgeon in the area who unfortunately loses his medical license. Together, they lead the way in Apgujeong-dong's plastic surgery industry.

Cast
 Ma Dong-seok as Dae-guk, a native Apgujeong-dong resident with booming a business idea
 Jung Kyung-ho as Park Ji-woo, a talented plastic surgeon who loses his medical license.
 Oh Na-ra as Oh Mi-jeong, the head of Insa Plastic Surgery's consultation office.
 Choi Byung-mo as Cho Tae-cheon, a charismatic businessman.
 Oh Yeon-seo as Hong Gyu Ok, the director of an Apgujeong VIP esthetic shop.
 Ryu Seung-soo
 Lim Hyeong-jun
 Han Bo-reum
 Jung Ji-so

Production
Principal photography began in August 2020 and ended on November 20, 2020.

On October 30, 2022, it was confirmed that the film's press conference was canceled due to the Itaewon Halloween crowd crush.

References

External links
 
 
 
 
 

2022 films
2020s South Korean films
2020s Korean-language films
2022 comedy films
South Korean comedy films
Films set in Seoul
Works about plastic surgery